Navarasa (the nine emotions), in India's performing arts traditions, are the nine emotions evoked in an audience.

Navarasa may also refer to:

 Navarasa (film), a 2005 Tamil language film directed by Santosh Sivan
 Navarasa (soundtrack), the soundtrack for the series
 Navarasa (web series), a 2021 Indian Tamil-language anthology series created by Mani Ratnam
 Navarasa: Nine Emotions, a 2020 album by Yorkston/Thorne/Khan

See also
 Navarasam (album)
 Navarasan
 Navras